Brad Jones is a music producer, mixer, and singer/songwriter. He has produced music for Josh Rouse, Cotton Mather, Chuck Prophet, M-Clan, Steve Forbert, Ron Sexsmith, Butterfly Boucher, Imperial Drag, Hayes Carll, Jill Sobule, Patty Griffin, Missy Higgins, Richard Julian, Allison Moorer and Shelby Lynne, David Mead, David Poe, Amy Rigby, Bruce Robison and Kelly Willis, Warren Zanes, Kim Richey, Ben Goldsmith, The Shazam, The Jones Sisters, Quique Gonzales, Jason and the Scorchers, Jump Little Children, and Over the Rhine.  Jones is also the operator and co-owner of Nashville recording studio Alex the Great Recording..

Albums (as artist)

Gilt-Flake
Label: Ginger Records 
Release: 1995
Tracks:
The Blunderbuss
Never To Come Again
Ophelia Floats Away
Miss July
Mary's Moving Day
Goodbye
The Staten Island Line
Miles and Miles To Go
Dig Down Deep
Nicole's Been Strange
My Messed Up Friend
I Tried
She's Looking Out A Window

Mountain Jack
by Hans Rotenberry and Brad Jones

Release: 2010

Tracks:
Count on Me
A Likely Lad
Froggy Mountain Shakedown
Next to You
Ain't Gonna Hurt Anyone
Greef
Back to Bristol
Putting On Airs Tonight
Buffalo Daughter
It Would Not Be Uncool

Yellow Pills volume 3
Label: Big Deal #2023-2
The Blunderbuss (from Gilt-Flake) appears on this compilation
Release: 1995

References

External links
 Allmusic Website with majority of Discography
(updated 2017)

Year of birth missing (living people)
Living people